Dmitry Vasilyevich Rigin (born 10 April 1985) is a Russian foil fencer, team bronze medal in the 2011 and 2014 European Fencing Championships.

Career
He was called into the national team for the European Championships in Sheffield. Russia saw off Israel, but were stopped by France in the semifinal. They overcame Germany in the match for the bronze medal, bringing Rigin his first European distinction. At Catania 2011, his first World Championships, he was defeated in the second round by USA's Gerek Meinhardt. These results pushed him to a world No.17 ranking at the end of the season and he was named “breakthrough of the year” by the Russian Fencing Federation.

Rigin failed however to qualify to the 2012 Summer Olympics and the 2011–12 and 2012–13 seasons proved disappointing. He returned to form in the 2013–14 season, reaching the quarter-finals in the La Coruña and St Petersburg World Cups. He won his second World Cup event in Havana. 

Rigin began the 2014–15 season by a silver medal at the Prince Takamodo World Cup in Tokyo, after a defeat in the final to USA's Race Imboden. In March 2015 he won the Havana Grand Prix after prevailing over USA's Alexander Massialas.

References

External links
 
  (archive)
  (archive)

1985 births
Living people
Russian male foil fencers
Universiade medalists in fencing
Universiade gold medalists for Russia
Sportspeople from Krasnoyarsk
Medalists at the 2009 Summer Universiade